Kang Hyung-chul (born 21 February 1982) is a South Korean sport shooter who competed in the 2004 Summer Olympics.

References

1982 births
Living people
South Korean male sport shooters
ISSF pistol shooters
Olympic shooters of South Korea
Shooters at the 2004 Summer Olympics
Shooters at the 2002 Asian Games
Asian Games medalists in shooting
Asian Games silver medalists for South Korea
Medalists at the 2002 Asian Games
20th-century South Korean people
21st-century South Korean people